Padmashree Ranjana Gauhar is an Odissi dancer.

She won the Padma Shree in 2003 and with the Sangeet Natak Akademi  Award for the year 2007 by the President of India.

References

Year of birth missing (living people)
Living people
Recipients of the Padma Shri in arts
Indian female classical dancers
Performers of Indian classical dance
Odissi exponents
Dancers from Odisha
20th-century Indian dancers
20th-century Indian women artists
Women artists from Odisha
Recipients of the Sangeet Natak Akademi Award